The 35th Luna Awards ceremony, presented by the Film Academy of the Philippines (FAP), honored the best Filipino films of 2016. It took place on August 26, 2017 at Resorts World Manila in Pasay, Philippines.

Winners and nominees

Awards 
Winners are listed first, highlighted in boldface.

Special Awards 
The following honorary awards were also awarded.

 Golden Reel Award  – Eddie Garcia
 Fernando Poe Jr. Lifetime Achievement Award  – Herbert Bautista
 Manuel de Leon Award for Exemplary Achievements  – Des Bautista and Bibsy Carballo
 Lamberto Avellana Memorial Award – Mario O’Hara and Lolita Rodriguez, (posthumous)
 Awards of Appreciation  – Lav Diaz and Charo Santos

References 

Luna Awards
2017 film awards